Miquel Carbonell i Selva (23 July 1854, Molins de Rei – 14 May 1896, Barcelona) was a Catalan painter, muralist and poet. He is especially known for his realistic portraits and landscapes of the area around the Llobregat River.

Biography
When he was only ten, he developed a tumor on his leg, which kept him bed-ridden for a year and caused permanent damage that required the use of a cane. At the age of thirteen, he was apprenticed to a painter in Barcelona. Two years later, he was enrolled at the Escola de la Llotja, where he studied with Antoni Caba.

His first exhibition was in 1872, at the Society of Fine Arts. He completed his studies there in 1875, having received several awards for composition, color and perspective.

In 1880, he moved to Madrid, although he still spent time in Barcelona and his hometown, where he was married in 1882. While in Madrid, he also did interior decoration.

In 1889, he joined with several other Catalan artists and went to Paris, where they participated in the Exposition Universelle.

In 1902, the Municipal Council in his hometown voted to name a street in his honor.

References

Further reading 
 Miquel Carbonell i Selva : pintor (1854-1896), Fundació Miquel Carbonell i Selva, 2007 
 Francesc Fontbona, et al., Miquel Carbonell i Selva: Pintor (1854- 1896), (exhibition catalog), Fundacio Caixa, 1997

External links

 Fundació Miquel Carbonell i Selva, Home page

1854 births
1896 deaths
Painters from Catalonia
People from Molins de Rei
Portrait painters
Landscape painters
19th-century Spanish painters
19th-century Spanish male artists
Spanish male painters